Stan Gorton (1946-2013) was an Australian rugby league footballer who played in the 1960s.

Originally from Cairns, Queensland, Stan Gorton came to the St George Dragons for six seasons between 1966-1971. Known as a terrific try scoring winger, Stan Gorton was the season's leading try scorer in the 1968 NSWRFL season. He retired in 1972 due to injuries that plagued his later career.

Stanley Thomas Gorton died on 6 June 2013 at Toowoomba, Queensland aged 67.

References

1946 births
2013 deaths
St. George Dragons players
Australian rugby league players
Rugby league wingers
Date of birth missing
Rugby league players from Cairns